Trzcińsko  is a village in the administrative district of Gmina Janowice Wielkie, within Jelenia Góra County, Lower Silesian Voivodeship, in south-western Poland.

In 1945, the village's German residents were expelled when the new borders were established.

References

Villages in Karkonosze County